The Capitol Corridor is a  passenger train route in Northern California operated by Amtrak between San Jose, in the Bay Area, and Auburn, in the Sacramento Valley. The route is named after the two points most trains operate between, San Jose (which hosted the first state capitol of California) and Sacramento (which currently hosts the California State Capitol). The route runs roughly parallel to Interstate 880 and Interstate 80. Some trips run from Oakland to San Jose, while a single daily round trip runs all the way from San Jose to Auburn, in the foothills of the Sierra Nevada. Capitol Corridor trains started in 1991.

Like all regional trains in California, the Capitol Corridor is operated by a joint powers authority. The Capitol Corridor Joint Powers Authority (CCJPA) is governed by a board that includes two elected representatives from each of eight counties the train travels through. The CCJPA contracts with the San Francisco Bay Area Rapid Transit District to provide day-to-day management, and Amtrak to operate and maintain the rolling stock (locomotives and passenger cars). The California Department of Transportation (Caltrans) provides the funding and also owns the rolling stock.

History

Former service
The First transcontinental railroad was completed to Oakland from the south in 1869. Following the completion of the California Pacific Railroad in 1879, most long-distance service of the Southern Pacific (SP) reached Oakland from the north. Long-distance service from the south ran to San Francisco via the Peninsula; some trains had Oakland sections. The Western Pacific Railroad (completed to Oakland in 1910) and Santa Fe Railroad (completed to Oakland in 1903 over the former California and Nevada Railroad) largely ran long-distance service with limited local stops. Commuter service around Oakland was largely provided by the electric interurban trains of the SP-owned East Bay Electric Lines (1911–1941) and Key System (1901–1958).

By the end of the 1930s, the SP operated five daily local round trips plus a number of long-distance trains between Oakland and Sacramento. The Oakland Lark and an unnamed local train (an Oakland connection for the Coast Daylight) provided local service between Oakland and San Jose on the Coast Line. The inland Niles Subdivision was served by a daily Oakland–Tracy local and a commute-timed Oakland–San Jose local (which ran via Centerville and part of the Coast Line on the northbound trip and Milpitas southbound).

The Oakland–San Jose trip on the Niles Subdivision was discontinued on September 29, 1940, followed by the Oakland–Tracy trip in 1941. The two Oakland–San Jose trips on the Coast Line were discontinued on May 1, 1960. The last local service between Oakland and Sacramento was the Senator, discontinued by the SP on May 31, 1962 (though long-distance service continued).

Capitols

From the 1970s to the beginning of the 1990s, three Amtrak intercity trains operated in the Bay Area: the long-distance California Zephyr (Oakland/Emeryville–Chicago) and Coast Starlight (Los Angeles–Seattle), and the regional San Joaquin (Bakersfield–Oakland). Of the three lines, only the Coast Starlight ran between San Jose and Sacramento—once a day in each direction, and at inconvenient times (southbound early in the morning, northbound in the evening). In 1977, Amtrak approved an additional Oakland–Sacramento round trip, the Sacramentan; the service was never operated.

In 1990, California voters passed two ballot propositions providing $105 million to expand service along the route. The new service, named Capitols, debuted on December 12, 1991, with three daily round trips between San Jose and Sacramento. Of these, a single round trip continued to Roseville, an eastern Sacramento suburb.

One of the ballot propositions, Proposition 116, provided the name Capitol Corridor—so named because it links the location of California's first state capitol, San Jose, with the current location, Sacramento. The service was known as the Capitols until April 29, 2001, when Amtrak renamed it the Capitol Corridor.

Service changes

The Capitols originally ran via the Coast Line from Elmhurst to Santa Clara, with no stops between Oakland and San Jose. In 1992, after the completion of track and signal work, the Capitols were rerouted onto the Niles Subdivision further inland between Elmhurst and Newark.

The trip was cut back to Auburn (with the Rocklin stop retained) on February 27, 2000.

Service was gradually increased from the original three daily round trips. The fifth round trip was added in November 1998, followed by the sixth in February 1999.

Installation of positive train control along the route was completed by November 2018.

In response to low ridership as a result of the COVID-19 pandemic, the Capitol Corridor schedule was reduced to five daily trips on March 21, 2020, with discontinued Auburn service and many trips ending in Oakland. Three runs were added back on June 1 and Auburn service restored.

Proposed expansion

New stations
Additional stations have been proposed along the route at Hercules, Benicia, and Dixon.

Vision Plan
The Capitol Corridor Vision Implementation Plan is a long range outline of possible improvements to the service; several realignments along existing and new right-of-ways were considered and studied. Near term suggested improvements include double tracking between San Jose and a realignment to the Coast Subdivision and a new station at the Ardenwood Park-and-Ride followed by track improvements between Emeryville and Richmond. Later goals include tunneling under Jack London Square to eliminate the street-running section there, rerouting freight traffic over another right-of-way between Sacramento and Martinez, and eventual electrification of the line.

The 2018 Senate Bill 1 allocated $93 million in funds for the Capitol Corridor, partially for planning the realignment to the Coast Subdivision. , the Draft Environmental Impact Report for the realignment (branded as South Bay Connect) is expected to be completed at the end of 2020, followed by the Final Environmental Impact Report a year later. Design is to take place in 2022–23, with construction beginning in 2024. The project is to have a single new station at Ardenwood (at SR 84); stations at Hayward (at SR 92) and Newark Junction were considered but rejected.

Extensions

A third track between Sacramento and Roseville is planned to start construction in 2021, which would allow an initial increase from one round trip per day to three, with plans for up to ten. Extension east to Reno, Nevada was deemed unlikely in the Vision Implementation Plan due to heavy freight traffic over Donner Pass and lack of funding, though plans for such an expansion are being studied in 2022.

Extending service to downtown San Francisco by crossing the bay is being considered as part of a proposed second Transbay Tube. A study of a joint project providing a second crossing for BART began in 2019. San Francisco has not had direct intercity rail service since 1971.

Frequency and ridership
 
During fiscal year 2017 the Capitol Corridor service carried 1,607,277 passengers, a 2.9% increase over FY2016. Revenue in FY2017 was $33,970,000, a 5.3% increase over FY2016, with a 57% farebox recovery ratio. It is the fourth busiest Amtrak route by ridership, surpassed only by the Northeast Regional, Acela Express, and Pacific Surfliner. In large part due to the route's success,  is the busiest station on the route, the seventh busiest in the Amtrak system and the second busiest in California.

The Capitol Corridor is used by commuters between the Sacramento area and the Bay Area as an alternative to driving on congested Interstate 80. Monthly passes and discounted trip tickets are available. Many politicians, lobbyists, and aides live in the Bay Area and commute to their jobs in Sacramento, including those connecting to the train via Amtrak Thruway Motorcoach from San Francisco, while workers in the Oakland, San Francisco, and Silicon Valley employment centers take the Capitol Corridor trains from their less expensive homes in Solano County and the Sacramento metropolitan area.

Starting on August 28, 2006, the Capitol Corridor had 16 weekday trains each way between Oakland and Sacramento, up from twelve in 2005 and three in 1992. (Seven of the sixteen ran to/from San Jose.) According to its management, ridership on the Capitol Corridor trains tripled between 1998 and 2005. On August 13, 2012, the Capitol Corridor dropped from 16 to 15 weekday round trips between Oakland and Sacramento; one round trip was discontinued due to high fuel costs, low ridership, and a new ability to store an extra train overnight in a Sacramento railyard.

As of October 2022, trains run as follows:
 Auburn - San Jose: 1 round trip daily
 Sacramento - San Jose: 6 round trips on weekdays, 7 round trips on weekends
 Sacramento - Oakland Jack London Square: 6 round trips on weekdays, 4 round trips on weekends

Stations and connections

Governance

The Capitol Corridor is fully funded by the state through Caltrans Division of Rail and Mass Transportation (DRMT). Caltrans managed the line from its inception in 1991 to 1997, but in 1998 the administration of the route was transferred to Capitol Corridor Joint Powers Authority (CCJPA), formed by transit agencies of which the Capitol Corridor serves in order to have more local control, while still funded by Caltrans. CCJPA in turn contracted with BART for day-to-day management and staff support; also, CCJPA makes decisions on the service level of Capitol Corridor, capital improvements along the route, and passenger amenities aboard the trains.

The Capitol Corridor Joint Powers Authority is governed by a board of directors which consists of 16 representatives from its member agencies:
Placer County Transportation Planning Agency (PCTPA)
Solano Transportation Authority (STA)
Yolo County Transportation District (YCTD)
Sacramento Regional Transit District (Sac RT)
San Francisco Bay Area Rapid Transit District (BART)
Santa Clara Valley Transportation Authority (VTA)

Equipment

The Capitol Corridor and its administration agency, the CCJPA, are responsible for the maintenance of the Amtrak California's Northern California fleet, which is used by both the Capitol Corridor and the San Joaquin routes.

When the Capitol Corridor debuted in 1991, it used Amtrak F40PH locomotives and Amtrak Horizon Fleet cars. Dash 8 locomotives were also used as they were brand new at the time. This equipment was used until the mid-1990s when most of the current state-purchased equipment arrived.

The current Northern California fleet includes fifteen EMD F59PHI locomotives (numbered 2001 through 2015), eight Siemens Charger locomotives (numbered 2101 through 2108) and a large number of bi-level coaches and café cars which are known as "California Cars". All cars are named after mountains and rivers of California. There are two series of California Cars, the 8000 series and the newer 6000 series. Standard Amtrak equipment such as the GE P42DC, Amtrak's main locomotive, standard Amtrak Dash 8 locomotives, and Superliner cars can appear on Capitol Corridor trains as substitutes.

In rarer cases, F59PHIs from the Amtrak Surfliner and Cascades trains were used before they were sold to Metra. Before 2012, Caltrain EMD F40PH and MPI MP36PH-3C locomotives have been used as substitutes engines, and entire Caltrain trainsets have also been seen during busy periods, such as the peak Thanksgiving holiday weekend.

References

Notes

External links 

Public transportation in San Francisco
Amtrak routes
Passenger rail transportation in California
Railway services introduced in 1991